Clitoral enlargement methods are forms of body modification that have the potential to enhance the size of the clitoris and increase sexual pleasure. Clitoral enlargement can be accomplished through a variety of means, each potentially having certain side effects and risks.

The congenital or acquired medical condition known as clitoromegaly or macroclitoris contrasts intentional enlargement of the clitoris, though any abnormal enlargement of the clitoris is sometimes referred to as clitoromegaly.

Purpose

A very small clitoris may not get adequate pleasure from sexual acts that can directly stimulate the clitoris, such as the coital alignment technique, and may therefore choose to enlarge the clitoris to increase pleasure. Women with normally sized clitorises may wish to increase the size to increase pleasure or to appear more attractive. The clitoral pump, like the penis pump, may be used prior to or during masturbation for temporary effect. Some testosterone-altered female bodybuilders with enlarged clitorises may better be able to use such techniques.

Methods

The most common methods of clitoris enlargement are:

 Use of androgen containing creams on the clitoris
 Systemic use of testosterone for an extended time, as per some female bodybuilders 
 Use of a clitoral pump

There is disagreement on the best approach; many claim size increases from pumping while others say testosterone is the only way to obtain significant results. Both methods involve some risk. If pumping is done incorrectly, it can cause damage to the erectile tissue and blood vessels. The use of any steroid such as testosterone incurs risk as these compounds can have systemic effects.

While the systemic effects of testosterone are both expected and desired in both trans men and female body builders, they are generally undesirable for most women. Thus, one of the most pressing questions is whether the clitoris can be enlarged without causing other unwanted virilizing effects. To reduce side effects, most women apply only topically and locally. Anecdotal evidence suggests that DHT (dihydrotestosterone), a very potent androgen, can effectively be used for this purpose with minimal side effects. No scientific studies have confirmed this effect in female anatomy, but research targeting the treatment of micropenis has found that local application of DHT is very effective at stimulating penile growth in microphalli. Due to the biological similarity between penile and clitoral tissue, significant growth of the clitoris is likely. Unlike testosterone, DHT cannot be converted into the estrogen estradiol and is thus ideal for generating purely androgenic effects. 

Clitoral pumping is another applied method of clitoris enlargement. Evidence proving its effectiveness is still lacking but it continues to be a popular activity. The potential dangers of vacuum pumping are well known to those familiar with penis pumping. If the applied vacuum pressure is too great it can cause bursting of blood vessels, bruising, blistering, damage to erectile tissue, and other types of trauma. Safe pressures are generally considered to be less than 5 in-Hg of vacuum or 0.17 atm (16 kPa).

A less common approach to clitoral enlargement is saline injection.

See also
 Labia stretching

References

Female genital modification
Enlarge